At Early Morning is a 1965 Soviet drama film directed by Tatyana Lioznova.

Plot 
Alyosha and Nadia early lost their parents, but the father's friend and the people around him helped them to maintain kindness and openness.

Cast 
 Nikolay Merzlikin as Alesha Smirnov
 Valeriy Nosik as Dimka
 Nina Nikitina as Nadya Smirnova
 Olga Bobkova as Nadya Smirnova
 Oleg Zhakov as Nikolai Nikolaevich
 Nina Sazonova as Galina Petrovna
 Zinaida Vorkul as Olya's mother
 Margarita Lifanova as Zhanna Vasilyevna
 Yelena Maksimova as Dimka's mother
 Ivan Ryzhov as Dmitri Dmitrievich

References

External links 
 

1965 films
1960s Russian-language films
Soviet drama films
1965 drama films